Cryptoplax is a genus of polyplacophoran molluscs.
The genus consists of the following living species: 
Cryptoplax burrowi E. A. Smith, 1884
Cryptoplax caledonicus Rochebrune, 1882
Cryptoplax dawydoffi Leloup, 1937
Cryptoplax dimidiata Ang, 1967
Cryptoplax dupuisi Ashby, 1931
Cryptoplax elioti Pilsbry, 1901
Cryptoplax hartmeyeri Thiele, 1911
Cryptoplax iredalei Ashby, 1923
Cryptoplax japonica Pilsbry, 1901
Cryptoplax larvaeformis Burrow, 1815
Cryptoplax mystica Iredale & Hull, 1925
Cryptoplax oculata Quoy & Gaimard, 1835
Cryptoplax plana Ang, 1967
Cryptoplax propior Is. & Iw. Taki, 1930
Cryptoplax royana Iredale & Hull, 1925
Cryptoplax striata Lamarck, 1819
Cryptoplax sykesi Thiele, 1909

References 

Neogene molluscs
Chiton genera
Extant Miocene first appearances